Following is a list of dams and reservoirs in Pennsylvania.

All major dams are linked below.

Dams and reservoirs in Pennsylvania 

This list is incomplete.  You can help Wikipedia by expanding it.

 Adam T. Bower Memorial Dam, Lake Augusta, Commonwealth of Pennsylvania
 Allegheny River Lock and Dam No. 2, USACE
 Allegheny River Lock and Dam No. 3, USACE
 Allegheny River Lock and Dam No. 4, USACE
 Allegheny River Lock and Dam No. 5, USACE
 Allegheny River Lock and Dam No. 6, USACE
 Allegheny River Lock and Dam No. 7, USACE
 Allegheny River Lock and Dam No. 8, USACE
 Allegheny River Lock and Dam No. 9, USACE
 Alvin R. Bush Dam, USACE
 Austin Dam (Bayliss Dam), unnamed reservoir, privately owned (failed 1911)
 Beaver Run Dam, Beaver Run Reservoir, Municipal Authority Of Westmoreland County
 Beltzville Dam, Beltzville Lake, USACE
 Braddock Locks & Dam, Monongahela River, USACE
 Brandonville Pumping Station Dam, NDS ID Number PA-661 Susquehanna River Basin, Davis Run, Schuylkill County
 Charleroi Locks & Dam, Monongahela River, USACE
Conemaugh Dam, Conemaugh River Lake, USACE
 Crooked Creek Dam, Crooked Creek Lake, United States Army Corps of Engineers
 Curwensville Dam, Curwensville Lake, USACE
 Dashields Locks and Dam, Ohio River, USACE
 Davis Island Lock and Dam Site, Ohio River, USACE (abandoned)
 DeHart Dam, Dehart Reservoir, City of Harrisburg
 Dock Street Dam, on the Susquehanna River, City of Harrisburg
 East Branch Clarion River Lake, USACE
 Elizabeth Locks & Dam, Monongahela River, USACE
 Emsworth Locks and Dams, Ohio River, USACE
 Francis E. Walter Dam, Francis E. Walter Reservoir, USACE
 George B. Stevenson Dam, USACE
 Grays Landing Lock & Dam, Monongahela River, USACE
 H. A. Stewart Dam, Latrobe Reservoir, City of Latrobe
 Holtwood Dam, Lake Aldred, Pennsylvania Power and Light
 Kinzua Dam, Allegheny Reservoir, USACE
 Lake Arthur Dam, Lake Arthur, Commonwealth of Pennsylvania
 Laurel Creek Dam, Municipal Authority of the Borough of Lewistown
 Laurel Run Dam, Laurel Run Reservoir, Johnstown Water Authority (failed)
 Letterkenny Dam, Letterkenny Reservoir on the Conodoguinet Creek, Letterkenny Industrial Development Authority and Franklin County General Authority
 Mahoning Creek Dam, Mahoning Creek Lake, USACE
 Maxwell Lock & Dam, Monongahela River, USACE
 Meadow Run Dam in Bear Creek, privately owned
 Meadow Grounds Dam, Meadow Grounds Lake, Pennsylvania Game Commission
 Montgomery Island Locks and Dam, Ohio River, USACE
 Mountain Lake Dam in Bear Creek, privately owned
 Nockamixon Dam, Lake Nockamixon, Commonwealth of Pennsylvania
 Point Marion Lock and Dam, unnamed reservoir on the Monongahela River, USACE
 Quemahoning Dam, Quemahoning Reservoir, Cambria Somerset Authority
 Raystown Dam, Raystown Lake, USACE
 Safe Harbor Dam, Lake Clarke, Safe Harbor Water Power Corporation
 Segriest Dam, Lebanon Reservoir, City of Lebanon
 Shenango Dam, Shenango River Lake, USACE
 South Fork Dam, failed in 1889 causing the Johnstown Flood, privately owned
 Tionesta Dam, Tionesta Lake, USACE
 Wallenpaupack Dam, Lake Wallenpaupack, Talen Energy
 Warrior Ridge Dam and Hydroelectric Plant, unnamed reservoir, privately owned
 Wrightsville Dam, unnamed reservoir (demolished)
 York Haven Dam, Lake Fredrick reservoir on the Susquehanna River, Cube Hydro Partners
 Youghiogheny Dam, Youghiogheny River Lake, USACE

References 

 
 
Pennsylvania
Dams
Dams